Amnon Harlap (born 13 December 1909 - died 29 May 2006) was an Israeli footballer, who played for Hapoel Tel Aviv and the Mandatory Palestine national football team.

Playing career
Harlap was born in Rehovot in 1909, and started playing football with friends in his hometown. At high-school age, he attended the Herzliya Hebrew Gymnasium in Tel Aviv, where he joined local youth club Allenby Tel Aviv, which was initially affiliated with Maccabi Tel Aviv, but its members decided to withdraw from Maccabi, due to the professional attitude towards sports and merged in 1927 with Hapoel Tel Aviv. Harlap stayed with Hapoel until 1935, but in loan one year to Belgium by ARA La Gantoise where he play two games in Second Division. When he was forced to retire from football due to injury. Harlap won 2 championships and 2 cups, scoring the first goal in the 1934 cup final.
Harlap was also part of the Mandatory Palestine national football team, and played two matches for the team, against Egypt in 1934.

Personal life
After retiring, Harlap lived in Rehovot, where he worked at the family's business, a construction materials shop. He was also a board member of Hapoel Rehovot. He was brother-in-low of Yitzhak Katz , who married Harlap's sister, Bat-Sheva. His great-nephew is singer and actor Gidi Gov.

Honours
League Championships (2):
 1933–34, 1934–35
Cup (2):
1928, 1934

External links
Amnon Harlap Hapoel Wiki

References

1909 births
2006 deaths
Israeli Jews
Mandatory Palestine footballers
Israeli footballers
Hapoel Tel Aviv F.C. players
Hapoel Rehovot F.C. players
Association football forwards
Mandatory Palestine international footballers